{{DISPLAYTITLE:C19H26N2O4S}}
The molecular formula C19H26N2O4S (molar mass: 378.49 g/mol, exact mass: 378.1613 u) may refer to:

 Gemopatrilat
 Zinterol